The Murray Cup is a rugby union club knockout competition which takes places in KwaZulu-Natal, and is affiliated with the KwaZulu-Natal Rugby Union (KZNRU).

History

The Murray Cup was founded in 1890, and is named after Sir TK Murray. Murray was appointed in June 1890 as the first President of the Natal Rugby Union, which today is known as the KwaZulu-Natal Rugby Union. He presented the union with its first trophy, The Murray Cup. The trophy was to be used for a challenge/knockout competition.

The Murray Cup is now the oldest knockout rugby competition in World Rugby.

Sponsors

In 1957, South African Breweries came on board as sponsors, and the competition was renamed to the SAB Murray Cup. The sponsorship continued until 2016. There was no title sponsor in 2017.

In 2018, Hollywoodbets were announced as title sponsors of the Murray Cup. The competition is now known as the Hollywoodbets Murray Cup.

Rule changes

In 2018, the following rule changes were implemented to increase the pace and excitement of the game.
 No kicking outside of your own 22 m for the first 10 minutes of each half;
 Tries scored under the poles do not require a conversion (automatic 7 points);
 Conversions must be taken within 30 seconds;
 One strategic break per half, meaning there will be four 20-minute quarters to the game;
 Each squad will comprise 25 players.

The tournament format saw the eight 1st Division teams, host the Premier Leagues teams in the qualifying rounds. The losing team from this round would then take part in the Junior Murray Cup.

Participating Teams

The teams participating in the 2019 Hollywoodbets Murray Cup are:

Premier Division:
 Amanzimtoti Rugby Club
 College Rovers
 Crusaders
 Durban Collegians
 Richards Bay Rugby Club
 UKZN Pietermaritzburg Impi
 Varsity College
 Westville Old Boys

First Division:
 Drakensberg
 Hillcrest Villagers
 Newcastle Highlanders
 Piet Retief Rugby Club
 South Coast Warriors
 UKZN Durban Impi
 Volksrust Rugby Club
 Vryheid Rugby Club

Past winners

Below is a list of all the previous winners of the Murray Cup, since its inauguration in 1890.

College Rovers are the current defending champions.

References 

Rugby union competitions in South Africa